The Miakka School House is a historic school located in Old Miakka, Florida. It is located at the junction of Miakka and Wilson Roads. On July 3, 1986, it was added to the U.S. National Register of Historic Places.

The building was constructed in July 1914 and completed in September 1914.

References

External links

 Sarasota County listings at National Register of Historic Places
 Florida's Office of Cultural and Historical Programs

National Register of Historic Places in Sarasota County, Florida
Vernacular architecture in Florida